The Great Unity is a Chinese utopian vision of the world in which everyone and everything is at peace. It is found in classical Chinese philosophy which has been invoked many times in the modern history of China.

History
The notion of the "Great Unity" appeared in the "Lǐyùn" (禮運) chapter of the Book of Rites, one of the Confucian Chinese classics. According to it, the society in Great Unity was ruled by the public, where the people elected men of virtue and ability to administer, and valued trust and amity. People did not only love their own parents and children, but others as well. People also secured the living of the elderly until their ends, let the adults be of use to the society, and helped the young grow. Those who were widowed, orphaned, childless, handicapped and diseased were all taken care of. Men took their responsibilities and women had their homes. People disliked seeing resources being wasted but did not seek to possess them; they wanted to exert their strength but did not do it for their own benefit. Therefore, selfish thoughts were dismissed, people refrained from stealing and robbery, and the outer doors remained open.

The concept was used by Kang Youwei in his visionary utopian treatise, The Book of Great Unity.

The Great Unity is also often mentioned in the writings of Sun Yat-sen and is included in his lyrics of the National Anthem of the Republic of China, currently in official use in Taiwan.

This ideology can be reflected in the following examples, each from a national anthem of the Republic of China:

  (literal translation: "Three Principles of the People, the aim of us, to build the Republic, to advance into Great Unity.") - National Anthem of the Republic of China 
 (literal translation: "Never abandon in desperation, nor being complacent with achievement; Glorify our nation and work promoting Great Unity.") - National Flag Anthem of the Republic of China
The concept was invoked in prominent occasions several times by Mao Zedong, including in his address "On the People's Democratic Dictatorship" in 1949, as the Communist Party prepared to assume control throughout mainland China.

See also 
 Moderately prosperous society
 Great Peace (Baháʼí)

References

Bibliography

Chinese philosophy
Chinese words and phrases
Confucianism
Mythical utopias